2011